Santiago del Nuevo Extremo may mean:

 Santiago del Nuevo Extremo, the original name given to the city of Santiago, Chile
 Santiago del Nuevo Extremo (band), a Chilean band founded in 1978